David B. Davies (birth unknown – death unknown) was a Welsh professional rugby league footballer who played in the 1900s and 1910s. He played at representative level for Wales and Welsh League XIII, and at club level for Merthyr Tydfil, Swinton and Oldham (Heritage No. 145), as a forward (prior to the specialist positions of), during the era of contested scrums.

International honours
David Davies won 8 caps for Wales in 1908–1913 while at Merthyr Tydfil, Swinton, and Oldham, and represented Welsh League XIII while at Merthyr Tydfil in the 14-13 victory over Australia at Penydarren Park, Merthyr Tydfil on Tuesday 19 January 1909.

Note
David Davies played at Swinton in the same era as, but was not related to, the brothers David "Dai" Davies and Daniel "Dan" Davies.

References

External links
 (archived by web.archive.org) Statistics at orl-heritagetrust.org.uk

Merthyr Tydfil RLFC players
Oldham R.L.F.C. players
Place of birth missing
Place of death missing
Rugby league forwards
Swinton Lions players
Wales national rugby league team players
Welsh League rugby league team players
Welsh rugby league players
Year of birth missing
Year of death missing